Buthaina Al-Yaqoubi (born January 31, 1991) is a track and field sprint athlete who competes internationally for Oman. She was the first woman to represent Oman at the Olympics.

Al-Yaqoubi represented Oman at the 2008 Summer Olympics in Beijing. She competed at the 100 metres sprint and placed 9th in her heat without advancing to the second round. She ran the distance in a time of 13.90 seconds.

References

External links
 

1991 births
Living people
Omani female sprinters
Olympic athletes of Oman
Athletes (track and field) at the 2008 Summer Olympics
Olympic female sprinters